The 1895 Calgary municipal election was scheduled for December 9, 1895 to elect a Mayor and nine Councillors to sit on the twelfth Calgary City Council from January 6, 1896 to January 4, 1897.

Background
Voting rights were provided to any male, single woman, or widowed British subject over twenty-one years of age who are assessed on the last revised assessment roll with a minimum property value of $200.

The election was held under multiple non-transferable vote where each elector was able to cast a ballot for the mayor and up to three ballots for separate councillors.

Results

Mayor
Alexander McBride

Councillors

Ward 1
James Alexander McKenzie
William Mahon Parslow
Silas Alexander Ramsay

Ward 2
John Creighton
James Stuart Mackie
Henry Brown

Ward 3
William Henry Cushing
Adam Robson McTavish
Walter Jarrett

See also
List of Calgary municipal elections

References

Sources
Frederick Hunter: THE MAYORS AND COUNCILS  OF  THE CORPORATION OF CALGARY Archived March 3, 2020

Municipal elections in Calgary
1895 elections in Canada
1890s in Calgary